The Planet Earth Rock and Roll Orchestra (PERRO) is a nickname given to some artists who recorded together in the early 1970s.  They were predominantly  members of Jefferson Airplane, the Grateful Dead, Quicksilver Messenger Service, and Crosby, Stills, Nash & Young .  Their first album together was for Paul Kantner/Jefferson Starship's Blows Against the Empire.

Starship founder Paul Kantner came up with the term "Planet Earth Rock and Roll Orchestra", a label of reference to the San Francisco musicians that played on David Crosby's If I Could Only Remember My Name.  During the sessions for Crosby's album at Wally Heider Studios, the musicians of each band (who were working in other rooms) dropped in to the sessions and improvised hours of music, and everything was recorded.  Some of the basic tracks played during these recorded sessions in 1971 were used for Crosby's album. Engineer Stephen Barncard and David Crosby made rough mixes of some of the session tapes, and in 1991 Graham Nash sent a DAT tape to Paul Kantner which later showed up in the tape trading markets as a 'pristine' digital copy. Barncard came up with the PERRO abbreviation when he needed to identify the 2 inch wide tapes on sides, standing vertically.

The "PERRO Chorus" is credited on Crosby's song, "What Are Their Names") and several other solo albums after Crosby's (see discography). The name Jefferson Starship was later used for Paul Kantner and Grace Slick's new band formed in 1974.  Paul Kantner recorded a solo album in 1983 as a tribute to this time, Planet Earth Rock and Roll Orchestra.

Rehearsal Tapes Personnel 
David Crosby – guitar, vocals
Graham Nash – guitar, vocals
Paul Kantner – guitar, banjo, vocals
Grace Slick – piano, vocals
Jorma Kaukonen – lead guitar
Jack Casady – bass
Jerry Garcia – guitar, vocals
Phil Lesh – bass
Bill Kreutzmann – drums
Mickey Hart – percussion
David Freiberg – viola, vocals
Stephen Barncard - producer, engineer, archivist

Discography

Notes

See also
San Francisco Sound

Rock music groups from California
Musical groups established in the 1970s
Musical groups disestablished in the 1980s
Musical groups from the San Francisco Bay Area
Rock music supergroups
1970s establishments in California
1980s disestablishments in California